Business Hallmark is published in Lagos, Nigeria and its website, hallmarknews.com specializes in business, policy and finance related articles. The site went live in March 2009 offering a mix of business related and general interest articles. It enjoyed keen readership in business communities and amongst tertiary institutions, owing to the varied information on business, policy and finance, available on the website. The strength of the newspaper was on well-researched editorial contents fused with statistical facts.

Since March 2009, Business Hallmark has been the watchdog and mouth-piece of the business community through its well-researched analysis and projections, and through the analytical scrutiny of annual reports, the website was able to accurately forecast the collapse of Nigeria's banking and financial sectors.

Business Hallmark newspapers also organizes a monthly Public Policy Forum where policy makers, Nigeria's top corporate executives from state parastatals and the private sectors are invited to speak in a town hall meeting. Audience cut across various sectors of the populace and usually students from the universities are also invited to participate.

On 10 February 2011, the newspaper launched its "Most Influential Nigerians 2010" project at a news conference in Lagos. 
However, Business Hallmark has now changed its name to Hallmark Newspaper. The newspaper was increasingly being seen as a business focused newspaper whereas, it provides in-depth research and perspective on Business and Financial Market Analysis, SMEs, Health, Politics, Entertainment and Passion and now publishes daily.

References

External links
 

Publications with year of establishment missing
Companies based in Lagos
Newspapers published in Lagos
Online newspapers published in Nigeria